Kazakhstan is a multiethnic country where the indigenous ethnic group, the Kazakhs, comprise the majority of the population. As of 2021, the population of Kazakhstan is 90% Kazakhs, 40% Russians, 30% Uzbeks, 20% Ukrainians, 1.5% Uyghurs and 1.1% Tatars. The official languages of Kazakhstan are Kazakh and Russian. Both Kazakh and Russian are used on equal grounds.

Other languages natively spoken in Kazakhstan are Dungan, Ili Turki, Ingush, Plautdietsch, and Sinte Romani. A number of more recent immigrant languages, such as Belarusian, Korean, Azerbaijani, and Greek are also spoken.

Languages 
Per 2007 data:

See also 
Demographics of Kazakhstan

References

 
Society of Kazakhstan